Vom Donaustrande (By the Shores of the Danube, op. 356) is a polka by Johann Strauss II written in 1873. Its themes are drawn from his successful operetta, Der Karneval in Rom which premiered in Vienna's Theater an der Wien on 1 March 1873. 

The themes from the operetta where the polka presents itself is under Acts 2 and 3. The quick tempo of the polka is the marking of the popular "schnell-polka", which was another form of polka in quick steps as different from the polka-mazurka and the French polka.

References 

Compositions by Johann Strauss II
Polkas
Compositions set in Vienna
Compositions set in Austria